After Maria is a 2019 American short documentary film directed by Nadia Hallgren and starring Glenda Martes. After Maria follows the families still struggling to pick up the pieces of their shattered life from Hurricane Maria.

It was released on May 24, 2019 on Netflix streaming.

Cast
 Glenda Martes

References

External links
 
 
 

2019 short documentary films
2019 films
Netflix original documentary films
2010s Spanish-language films
American short documentary films
Spanish-language American films
2010s American films